The Dominican Republic national beach handball team is the national team of the Dominican Republic. It is governed by the Dominican Republic Handball Federation and takes part in international beach handball competitions.

During the 2006 Beach Handball World Championships the team finished in 10th place after being defeated by the Russian team 2–0.

World Championships results
2006 – 10th place

Other competitions results
2022 Central American and Caribbean Beach Games – 5th place

See also
Dominican Republic men's national handball team
Dominican Republic women's national handball team

References

External links
Official website
IHF profile

Beach handball
National beach handball teams